Missed Aches is a 2009 16mm short 2D animated film  directed, produced and animated by Joanna Priestley. It was narrated by Taylor Mali and is based on his poem “The Impotence of Proofreading”, with sound design by Normand Roger and Pierre Yves Drapeau, music by Pierre Yves Drapeau with Denis Chartrand and Normand Roger, text animation by Brian Kinkley, character design and animation by Don Flores and storyboards by Dan Schaeffer.

Synopsis
Missed Aches demonstrates how the shortcomings of spellcheck can result in unexpected double entendres.  It combines animated characters with moving text and was written and narrated by poet Taylor Mali, who led teams to four championships in the National Poetry Slam (United States). The Black Maria Film Festival said: “This uproarious animation by one of the nation’s iconic animation artists colorfully serves up a cascade of malapropisms.”

Process
At the 2006 Wordstock Festival, Portland's big literary celebration, Priestley joined a sidebar workshop where two dozen people were waiting to hear Taylor Mali speak. Mali entered and performed the poem “ of Proofreading”. Priestley says: “The 70 something lady in a knit suit sitting next to me laughed so hard she fell off her chair. I immediately fell in love with this poem and desperately tried to connect with Mali after the reading but he was occupied by vending supervisors who would not allow him to sell his books. That same day, I found Mali’s email address online and sent him a message, following up with many more messages, drawings, videos and gifts. I must have worn him down, because over a year later I got a reply and our collaboration began. Taylor Mali was delightful to work with. He recorded a new version of the poem in his apartment, sent it to me and I used it to design the storyboard and timing for Missed Aches. I wanted to avoid illustrating the narration and created scenes that had some dissonance with the text but still related to it visually in several ways.”

Priestley met filmmaker and compositor Brian Kinkley after seeing his graduation film, The Dilemma at the Art Institute of Portland. She immediately saw the possibilities of adding animated text to the backgrounds of Missed Aches and hired Kinkley to do the animation. They went on to collaborate on five more films: Eye Liner (2010), Split Ends (2013), Bottle Neck (2015), North of Blue (2018, feature), and Jung & Restless (2020).

Soundtrack
Priestley had always wanted to work with famed Canadian composer/sound designer Normand Roger, who spent 40 years creating soundtracks for the National Film Board of Canada in Montreal, Canada. She contacted his wife, filmmaker and National Film Board of Canada Executive Producer Marcy Page who was a friend and that paved the way for Priestley to collaborate with Normand Roger. Roger collaborated on the sound design and music with award-winning composer Pierre Yves Drapeau and with accomplished composer Denis Chartrand on the music. Both Drapeau and Chartrand also work with the National Film Board of Canada.

Release
Missed Aches was released in 2009 and the world premiere was at the CFC Worldwide Short Film Festival (Canada). Missed Aches was screened in many retrospectives of Priestley's works including at REDCAT in Los Angeles on April 20, 2009, POW Festival at the Hollywood Theatre in Portland, Oregon, Stuttgart International Animation Festival (Germany) on May 3, 2017, British Film Institute National Film Theatre (London, UK) on May 13, 2017, Sweaty Eyeballs Animation Festival in Baltimore, MD on October 18, 2019 and Fantoche International Animation Festival (Baden, Switzerland) on September 3, 2019.

Awards
Black Maria Film Festival: First Prize (Jury Award) (United States) 
USA Film Festival: Finalist

Festivals
CFC Worldwide Short Film Festival (Canada) 
Melbourne International Animation Festival (Australia)
AniMadrid Animation Festival (Spain)
Ottawa International Animation Festival (Canada)
Barcelona Festival of Independent Cinema (Spain)
Ann Arbor Film Festival and Tour (United States)
Annecy International Animation Festival (France)
Interfilm Berlin (Germany) 
Tricky Women Festival (Austria)
Missed Aches Festivals Page 2
SICAF Animated Film Festival (Korea)
Vienna Independent Short Film Festival (Austria)
Animator International Festival (Poland)
VideoFest (United States)
Wiesbaden International Weekend of Animation (Germany)
Local Sightings, NorthWest Film Forum (United States)
ZEBRA Poetry Film Festival (Germany)
New Orleans Film Festival (United States)
Portland International Film Festival (United States)
Northwest Film and Video Festival (United States)
BEFILM Underground Film Festival (United States)
Visible Verse (Canada)
Portland Women's Film Festival (United States)
Film Columbia (United States)
ASIFA NW Showcase (United States)
Crossroads Film Festival (United States)
Cinefest Sudbury (Canada)
Salem Film Festival (United States)
Cuisle Limerick City International Poetry Festival (Ireland)
Festival Silêncio (Lisbon, Portugal)
Dawson City Short Film Festival (Yukon, Canada)
Blue Met Literature Festival (Montreal, Canada) 4-23-15

Touring programs
International Goethe-Institutes (world tour, 2014)
CFC Worldwide Short Film Festival Tour (2010)
Black Maria Film Festival Tour (2010)
Northwest Film and Video Festival Tour (2010)
Ann Arbor Film Festival Tour (2010)

References

External links

Joanna Priestley on IMDb. 
Joanna Priestley website
North of Blue website
Brian Kinkley website
Pierre Yves Drapeau website

1985 films
1985 animated films
1980s American animated films
1980s animated short films
American animated short films
Films directed by Joanna Priestley
2000s English-language films
1980s English-language films
2000s American films